Nkwelle-Ezunaka is one of the five towns in Oyi Local Government Area of Anambra State Nigeria.

See also 
 [[Nteje]]
 [[Awkuzu]]
 [[Onitsha]]

References 

places in Anambra State]]

[[Category:Populated
Populated places in Anambra State